Alexander Allan was a Scottish amateur footballer who played as a left half in the Scottish League for Queen's Park.

Personal life 
Allan served as a gunner in the Royal Garrison Artillery during the First World War.

Career statistics

References 

Scottish footballers
Queen's Park F.C. players
Footballers from Glasgow
Year of death missing
Royal Garrison Artillery soldiers
British Army personnel of World War I
Year of birth missing
Association football wing halves
Scottish military personnel